Olney Parish, New South Wales is a civil parish of King County, New South Wales.

References

Parishes of King County (New South Wales)
Southern Tablelands